Pranlukast (brand name Onon, オノン) is a cysteinyl leukotriene receptor-1 antagonist.  This drug works similarly to Merck & Co.'s montelukast (Singulair). It is widely used in Japan.

Medications of this class, which go under a variety of names according to whether one looks at the American, British or European system of nomenclature, have as their primary function the antagonism of bronchospasm caused, principally in asthmatics, by an allergic reaction to accidentally or inadvertently encountered allergens.

Medications of this group are normally used as an adjunct to the standard therapy of inhaled steroids with inhaled long- and/or short-acting beta-agonists. There are several similar medications in the group; all appear to be equally effective. Pranlukast is also reported as potential inhibitor of Mycobacterium tuberculosis infection in experimental models.

References

Leukotriene antagonists
Tetrazoles
Chromones
Merck & Co. brands
Benzamides
Phenol ethers